Harrison Mills may refer to:

Harrison Mills, British Columbia
Harrison Mills, Ohio
Harrison Mills, Missouri
 Harrison Mills, member of American electronic music duo, Odesza